Harbour Island is an island neighborhood within the city limits of Tampa, Florida and the sub-district within Downtown Tampa. The ZIP Code serving the area is 33602.

Geography
Harbour Island is situated adjacent to Downtown across the Garrison Channel. Other nearby areas include Davis Islands and Channelside. The Tampa Convention Center is located directly across the Harbour Island Bridge and Channelside is just across Beneficial Drive, both walking distance.

History
Harbour Island was originally known as Seddon Island, which was named after W. L. Seddon, chief engineer for the Seaboard Air Line Railway. In 1906, a public hearing was held to plan a new port for the city. Seddon's plans were adopted and soon his company dredged a channel and established a port facility on what was then called Grassy Island. The Seaboard Coast Line later sold the  island to the Beneficial Land Corporation in 1979 for residential, office and retail development purposes. The first phase of development did not begin until 1985. Up to that point, the island still housed a phosphate terminal and had freight rail access. Beneficial's chief executive, Finn M. W. Caspersen (1941-2009) envisioned transforming the island into a bustling waterfront with offices, shops and restaurants, much like Baltimore's Inner Harbor. Between 1985 and January 1999, Harbour Island was linked to Downtown Tampa by the Harbour Island People Mover, an automated rubber tired tram manufactured by Otis Transportation Systems that ran on an elevated concrete guideway connecting the Knights Point shopping center on Harbour Island, to the Ft Brooke Parking Garage half of a mile to the north, adjacent to the downtown core on the mainland.

Today

Today, the island consists of mostly private residential areas, including high-rise condos, apartments, row houses, single-family homes and large houses, as well as a yacht club. The island has a Westin hotel, Jackson's Bistro Bar & Sushi restaurant spanning 20,000 square feet boasting special event space, Sunday Brunch, waterfront dining, and a Friday and Saturday nightclub; as well as a Pizza and Sushi Shop that delivers. Located in the center of the island there are small shops; a Coffee Shop that specializes in fresh ingredients for breakfast & lunch, and local hotspot Cafe Dufrain focusing on seasonal cuisine & seafood with waterfront dining. The TECO Line Streetcar "in-town" trolley connects the island to downtown and Channelside. NEVs also connect the island to other core neighborhoods such as Hyde Park.

See also
Bayshore Boulevard
Channelside
Davis Islands
Downtown Tampa
Neighborhoods in Tampa, Florida

References

Neighborhoods in Tampa, Florida
Planned communities in Florida